KGEN may refer to:

 KGEN (AM), a radio station (1370 AM) licensed to Tulare, California, United States
 KGEN-FM, a radio station (94.5 FM) licensed to Hanford, California, United States